Rob Kutner is an American comedy writer.

Career
As a writer for Dennis Miller Live, he was nominated for a 2003 Writers' Guild of America Award. After Dennis Miller Live left the air, Kutner went on to write for The Daily Show, where he has won five Emmies to date.   Additionally, he has won a Peabody Award and an award from the Television Critics' Association. He was a writer for The Tonight Show with Conan O'Brien until January 22, 2010 and has stayed on Conan O'Brien's writing staff for the TBS television program, Conan.

In 2003, Kutner wrote the short film Pie Chi, which has been seen at numerous festivals and was broadcast on Showtime Television. His humor pieces have appeared in The New York Times, Esquire, Los Angeles Times, Maxim, and The Huffington Post.

His book Apocalypse How, a humorous guide on how to "make the end times the best of times," was released in May 2008.  His Kindle Single, "The Future According to Me," was released in July 2011. "The Future According to Me" was released as an Audible audiobook in June 2015, featuring voice performances by Emo Phillips, Kurt Andersen, Cecil Baldwin, and Eddie Pepitone. Kutner was also a co-creator of the comedy-music album "2776", which features numerous celebrities and benefits the charity OneKid OneWorld.

He is the creator of the sci-fi comedy comic book "Shrinkage" for Farrago Comics.

Personal life
Kutner was born to a Jewish family and raised in Atlanta, Georgia, where he attended The Westminster Schools. Comic actors Ed Helms and Brian Baumgartner attended Westminster at the same time. He studied at Princeton University, achieving an AB in anthropology in 1994. At Princeton he was the editor of the school's humor magazine, The Tiger and was a member of the improv comedy troupe "Quipfire".  He was also a member and the announcer for the Princeton University Band.

He currently resides in Los Angeles with his wife, writer Sheryl Zohn.  He is an observant Jew.

Kutner is represented by Chris Noriega at the Verve Agency.

References

External links 
 Personal Site for Rob Kutner
 Apocalypse How: Official Book Website
 Tiger Magazine
 Quipfire
 Princeton University Band

Princeton University alumni
American television writers
American male television writers
Living people
Jewish American screenwriters
The Westminster Schools alumni
Year of birth missing (living people)
21st-century American Jews